Sweet Rendezvous is the first EP by the South Korean girl group Nine Muses. It was released on March 8, 2012 with the song "Ticket" as the promotional song.

Background
Rumors of the comeback of the group started on February 21, 2012, speculating that the group was going to come back with a new digital single. On March 2, a teaser photo of the member Erin was revealed. In the photo, Erin seems to be unclothed underneath the giant ticket that covers her up, stamped with the words "Ticket", the name of the group "Nine Muses" and a date "20120308", which could be a possibility to be the concept and day of release, on March 8. On March 5, it was confirmed the new release is their debut mini-album by revealing the physical EP cover. On the same day, it was revealed the track list of the EP, which features two already released digital singles "Figaro", released on August 11, 2011, and "News", released on January 11, 2012, two new songs "Ticket", "Who R U" and their instrumentals. On March 6, more photos of the concept were revealed.

Composition
All songs from the mini-album were written by Song Soo Yun and composed by Han Jae-Ho and Kim Seung-Soo (also known as Sweetune). They are also known for producing songs for the groups Infinite (Be Mine, Paradise, Cover Girl), KARA (Mister, Lupin, Jumping, Step and more), Rainbow (A, Mach), f(x) (Love) and more.

Music video
A teaser of the music video for "Ticket" was released on March 6, 2012. The full music video was  released on March 8, 2012, along with the EP release. A special "V Line" dance version was released on YouTube by their company, Star Empire Entertainment, on March 22.

Promotions
Promotions of the song "Ticket" started on March 8, on Mnet's show M! Countdown. The song was also promoted on the shows Music Bank, Music Core and Inkigayo. The promotions ended one month later, on April 8, on SBS's Inkigayo.

Track listing

Charts

Album chart

Single chart

Sales

Release history

References

External links 
 
 
 

2012 debut EPs
Dance-pop EPs
Korean-language EPs
Kakao M EPs
Nine Muses (band) albums